Tugen is the language spoken by the about 200,000 Tugen people of the broader Kalenjin group in Kenya. As a part of the Kalenjin dialect cluster, it is most closely related to such varieties as Kipsigis and Nandi.

The Tugen is made up of three main sub-groups, the Lembus to the south, the Arror in the north and the Samor in the central parts of Baringo district, Kenya.

References

Kalenjin languages
Languages of Kenya